Cynanchum is a genus of about 300 species including some swallowworts, belonging to the family Apocynaceae. The taxon name comes from Greek kynos (meaning "dog") and anchein ("to choke"), hence the common name for several species is dog-strangling vine. Most species are non-succulent climbers or twiners. There is some evidence of toxicity.

Morphology
These plants are perennial herbs or subshrubs, often growing from rhizomes. The leaves are usually oppositely arranged and sometimes are borne on petioles. The inflorescences and flowers come in a variety of shapes.

Like other species of the milkweed family, these plants bear follicles, which are podlike dry fruits.

Distribution
These species are found throughout the tropics and subtropics. Several species also grow in temperate regions.

Importance
The root of Cynanchum atratum is used in Chinese traditional medicine and called Bai wei. Several other species had traditional Chinese medicinal uses.

Classification
Cynanchum as defined in the late 20th century (to include about 400 species) is polyphyletic and is being broken up. Species are being moved to genera including Orthosia, Pentarrhinum, and Vincetoxicum, with a group of mostly Old World species staying in Cynanchum, and old genera such as Raphistemma brought to synonymy. Revision of the genus taxonomy in 2023 identified two new synonyms: Vincetoxicum sibiricum f. linearifolium, described from Shandong, China in 1877, but long neglected and Cynanchum gobicum, previously believed to be endemic to Mongolia.

Species
, Plants of the World Online accepted the following species:

 Cynanchum absconditum Liede
 Cynanchum abyssinicum Decne.
 Cynanchum acidum (Roxb.) Oken
 Cynanchum aculeatum (Desc.) Liede & Meve
 Cynanchum acuminatum Humb. & Bonpl. ex Schult.
 Cynanchum acutum L.
 Cynanchum adalinae (K.Schum.) K.Schum.
 Cynanchum africanum (L.) Hoffmanns.
 Cynanchum alatum Wight & Arn.
 Cynanchum alternilobum (M.G.Gilbert & P.T.Li) Liede & Khanum
 Cynanchum altiscandens K.Schum.
 Cynanchum ambovombense (Liede) Liede & Meve
 Cynanchum ampanihense Jum. & H.Perrier
 Cynanchum analamazaotrense Choux
 Cynanchum anderssonii Morillo
 Cynanchum andringitrense Choux
 Cynanchum angavokeliense Choux
 Cynanchum annularium (Roxb.) Liede & Khanum
 Cynanchum ansamalense Liede
 Cynanchum anthonyanum Hand.-Mazz.
 Cynanchum antsiranense (Meve & Liede) Liede & Meve
 Cynanchum appendiculatopsis Liede
 Cynanchum appendiculatum Choux
 Cynanchum arabicum (Bruyns & P.I.Forst.) Meve & Liede
 Cynanchum arenarium Jum. & H.Perrier
 Cynanchum areysianum (Bruyns) Meve & Liede
 Cynanchum balense Liede
 Cynanchum baronii Choux
 Cynanchum batangense P.T.Li
 Cynanchum beatricis Morillo
 Cynanchum bernardii Morillo
 Cynanchum bicampanulatum M.G.Gilbert & P.T.Li
 Cynanchum bisinuatum Jum. & H.Perrier
 Cynanchum blandum (Decne.) Sundell
 Cynanchum blyttioides Liede
 Cynanchum bojerianum (Decne.) Choux
 Cynanchum bosseri Liede
 Cynanchum boudieri H.Lév. & Vaniot
 Cynanchum boveanum Decne.
 Cynanchum bowmanii S.T.Blake
 Cynanchum brasiliense (Morillo) Liede
 Cynanchum brevicoronatum M.G.Gilbert & P.T.Li
 Cynanchum brevipedicellatum (P.I.Forst.) Liede & Meve
 Cynanchum brevipedunculatum J.Y.Shen
 Cynanchum bricenoi Morillo
 Cynanchum bungei Decne.
 Cynanchum callialatum Buch.-Ham. ex Wight
 Cynanchum carautanum (Fontella & E.A.Schwarz) Morillo
 Cynanchum caudiculatum Rapini
 Cynanchum caudigerum R.W.Holm
 Cynanchum celebicum Schltr.
 Cynanchum chanchanense Morillo
 Cynanchum chinense R.Br.
 Cynanchum chouxii Liede & Meve
 Cynanchum comorense Choux
 Cynanchum compactum Choux
 Cynanchum corymbosum Wight
 Cynanchum crassiantherae Liede
 Cynanchum crassipedicellatum Meve & Liede
 Cynanchum cristalinense Morillo
 Cynanchum cuatrecasasii Morillo
 Cynanchum cubense (A.Rich.) Woodson
 Cynanchum cucullatum N.E.Br.
 Cynanchum cyathiforme (Sundell) W.D.Stevens
 Cynanchum dalhousiae Wight
 Cynanchum daltonii (Decne.) Liede & Meve
 Cynanchum danguyanum Choux
 Cynanchum decaryi Choux
 Cynanchum decipiens C.K.Schneid.
 Cynanchum decorsei (Costantin & Gallaud) Liede & Meve
 Cynanchum defilippii Delponte
 Cynanchum descoingsii Rauh
 Cynanchum diazmirandae Morillo
 Cynanchum dimidiatum (Hassk.) Boerl.
 Cynanchum doleriticum Goyder
 Cynanchum dombeyanum (Decne.) Morillo
 Cynanchum duclouxii M.G.Gilbert & P.T.Li
 Cynanchum elachistemmoides (Liede & Meve) Liede & Meve
 Cynanchum elegans (Benth.) Domin
 Cynanchum ellipticum (Harv.) R.A.Dyer
 Cynanchum erikseniae Morillo
 Cynanchum erythranthum Jum. & H.Perrier
 Cynanchum ethiopicum Liede & Khanum
 Cynanchum eurychitoides (K.Schum.) K.Schum.
 Cynanchum eurychiton (Decne.) K.Schum.
 Cynanchum falcatum Hutch. & E.A.Bruce
 Cynanchum fasciculiflorum Morillo
 Cynanchum fernandezii Morillo
 Cynanchum fimbricoronum P.T.Li
 Cynanchum floribundum R.Br.
 Cynanchum floriferum Liede & Meve
 Cynanchum foetidum (Cav.) Kunth
 Cynanchum folotsioides Liede & Meve
 Cynanchum forskaolianum Meve & Liede
 Cynanchum fragrans (Wall.) Liede & Khanum
 Cynanchum gentryi (Morillo) Liede
 Cynanchum gerrardii (Harv.) Liede
 Cynanchum gilbertii Liede
 Cynanchum giraldii Schltr.
 Cynanchum glomeratum Bosser
 Cynanchum gobicum Grubov
 Cynanchum goertsianum Morillo
 Cynanchum gonoloboides Schltr.
 Cynanchum gracillimum Wall. ex Wight
 Cynanchum graminiforme Liede
 Cynanchum grandidieri Liede & Meve
 Cynanchum graphistemmatoides Liede & Khanum
 Cynanchum guatemalense Dugand
 Cynanchum guehoi Bosser
 Cynanchum hardyi Liede & Meve
 Cynanchum hastifolium K.Schum.
 Cynanchum haughtii Woodson
 Cynanchum hemsleyanum (Oliv.) Liede & Khanum
 Cynanchum heteromorphum Vatke
 Cynanchum heydei Hook.f.
 Cynanchum hickenii Malme
 Cynanchum hoedimeerium Bakh.f.
 Cynanchum hooperianum (Blume) Liede & Khanum
 Cynanchum hubeiense Wen B.Xu, B.S.Xia & J.Y.Shen
 Cynanchum humbert-capuronii Liede & Meve
 Cynanchum implicatum (Jum. & H.Perrier) Jum. & H.Perrier
 Cynanchum insigne (N.E.Br.) Liede & Meve
 Cynanchum insipidum (E.Mey.) Liede & Khanum
 Cynanchum insulanum(Hance) Hemsl.
 Cynanchum itremense Liede
 Cynanchum jaliscanum (Vail) Woodson
 Cynanchum jaramilloi Morillo
 Cynanchum juliani-marnieri Desc.
 Cynanchum jumellei Choux
 Cynanchum junciforme (Decne.) Liede
 Cynanchum kaschgaricum Y.X.Liou
 Cynanchum kingdonwardii M.G.Gilbert & P.T.Li
 Cynanchum kintungense Tsiang
 Cynanchum kwangsiense Tsiang & H.D.Zhang
 Cynanchum laeve - honeyvine
 Cynanchum lanhsuense T.Yamaz.
 Cynanchum lecomtei Choux
 Cynanchum ledermannii Schltr.
 Cynanchum leptolepis (Benth.) Domin
 Cynanchum leptostephanum Diels
 Cynanchum leucophellum Diels
 Cynanchum ligulatum (Benth.) Woodson
 Cynanchum lineare N.E.Br.
 Cynanchum liukiuense Warb.
 Cynanchum loheri Schltr.
 Cynanchum longipedunculatum M.G.Gilbert & P.T.Li
 Cynanchum longipes N.E.Br.
 Cynanchum longirostrum (K.Schum.) W.D.Stevens
 Cynanchum lopezpalaciosii Morillo
 Cynanchum luteifluens (Jum. & H.Perrier) Desc.
 Cynanchum lysimachioides Y.Tsiang & P.T.Li
 Cynanchum maasii Morillo
 Cynanchum macranthum Jum. & H.Perrier
 Cynanchum macrolobum Jum. & H.Perrier
 Cynanchum madagascariense K.Schum.
 Cynanchum magale Buch.-Ham. ex Dillwyn
 Cynanchum mahafalense Jum. & H.Perrier
 Cynanchum malampayae (Kloppenb., Cajano & Hadsall) Sodusta
 Cynanchum mariense (Meve & Liede) Liede & Meve
 Cynanchum mariquitense Mutis
 Cynanchum marnieranum Rauh
 Cynanchum masoalense Choux
 Cynanchum maximoviczii Pobed.
 Cynanchum megalanthum M.G.Gilbert & P.T.Li
 Cynanchum membranaceum (Liede & Meve) Liede & Meve
 Cynanchum menarandrense Jum. & H.Perrier
 Cynanchum messeri (Buchenau) Jum. & H.Perrier
 Cynanchum mevei Liede
 Cynanchum meyeri (Decne.) Schltr.
 Cynanchum microstemma (Turcz.) Morillo
 Cynanchum minahassae Schltr.
 Cynanchum montevidense Spreng.
 Cynanchum moramangense Choux
 Cynanchum moratii Liede
 Cynanchum mossambicense K.Schum.
 Cynanchum muricatum (Blume) Boerl.
 Cynanchum napiferum Choux
 Cynanchum natalitium Schltr.
 Cynanchum nematostemma Liede
 Cynanchum nielsenii Morillo
 Cynanchum obovatum (Decne.) Choux
 Cynanchum obtusifolium L.f.
 Cynanchum officinale (Hemsl.) Tsiang & H.D.Zhang
 Cynanchum orangeanum (Schltr.) N.E.Br.
 Cynanchum oresbium (Bruyns) Goyder
 Cynanchum otophyllum C.K.Schneid.
 Cynanchum ovalifolium Wight
 Cynanchum pachycladon Choux
 Cynanchum pamirense Tsiang & H.D.Zhang
 Cynanchum papillatum Choux
 Cynanchum paramorum Morillo
 Cynanchum pearsonianum Liede & Meve
 Cynanchum pedunculatum R.Br.
 Cynanchum peraffine Woodson
 Cynanchum perrieri Choux
 Cynanchum petignatii Liede & Rauh
 Cynanchum phillipsonianum Liede & Meve
 Cynanchum physocarpum Schltr.
 Cynanchum pichi-sermollianum (Raimondo & Fici) Liede & Khanum
 Cynanchum pietrangelii Morillo
 Cynanchum polyanthum K.Schum.
 Cynanchum praecox Schltr. ex S.Moore
 Cynanchum prevostii Morillo
 Cynanchum puberulum F.Muell. ex Benth.
 Cynanchum pulchellum (Wall.) Liede & Khanum
 Cynanchum purpureiflorum Morillo
 Cynanchum purpureum  (Pall.) K.Schum.
 Cynanchum pusilum Grubov
 Cynanchum pycnoneuroides Choux
 Cynanchum racemosum (Jacq.) Jacq.
 Cynanchum radians (Forssk.) Lam.
 Cynanchum radiatum Jum. & H.Perrier
 Cynanchum rauhianum Desc.
 Cynanchum registanense Jayanthi
 Cynanchum rensonii (Pittier) Woodson
 Cynanchum repandum (Decne.) K.Schum.
 Cynanchum resiliens (B.R.Adams & R.W.K.Holland) Goyder
 Cynanchum revoilii (Franch.) Khanum & Liede
 Cynanchum riometense Sundell
 Cynanchum rioparanense Sundell
 Cynanchum rossii Rauh
  (Turcz.) Liede & Khanum
 Cynanchum roulinioides (E.Fourn.) Rapini
 Cynanchum rubricoronae Liede
 Cynanchum rungweense Bullock
 Cynanchum sahyadricum (Ansari & Hemadri) Liede & Khanum
 Cynanchum sarcomedium Meve & Liede
 Cynanchum schistoglossum Schltr.
 Cynanchum scopulosum Bosser
 Cynanchum sessiliflorum (Decne.) Liede
 Cynanchum sigridiae Meve & M.Teissier
 Cynanchum sinoracemosum M.G.Gilbert & P.T.Li
 Cynanchum socotranum (Lavranos) Meve & Liede
 Cynanchum somaliense (N.E.Br.) N.E.Br.
 Cynanchum staubii Bosser
 Cynanchum stenospira K.Schum.
 Cynanchum stoloniferum (B.R.Adams & R.W.K.Holland) Goyder
 Cynanchum subpaniculatum Woodson
 Cynanchum subtilis Liede
 Cynanchum suluense Schltr.
 Cynanchum sumbawanum Warb.
 Cynanchum surrubriflorum W.D.Stevens
 Cynanchum szechuanense Tsiang & H.D.Zhang
 Cynanchum tamense Morillo
 Cynanchum thruppii (Oliv.) Khanum & Liede
 Cynanchum toliari Liede & Meve
 Cynanchum trollii Liede & Meve
 Cynanchum tsaratananense Choux
 Cynanchum tuberculatum (Blume) Boerl.
 Cynanchum tunicatum (Retz.) Alston
 Cynanchum umtalense Liede
 Cynanchum unguiculatum (Britton) Markgr.
 Cynanchum vanlessenii (Lavranos) Goyder
 Cynanchum verrucosum (Desc.) Liede & Meve
 Cynanchum viminale (L.) L.
 Cynanchum violator R.W.Holm
 Cynanchum virens (E.Mey.) D.Dietr.
 Cynanchum wallichii Wight
 Cynanchum warburgii Schltr.
 Cynanchum wilfordii (Maxim.) Hook.f.
 Cynanchum zeyheri Schltr.

Former species
 Cynanchum auriculatum = Vincetoxicum auriculatum
 Cynanchum arizonicum = Metastelma arizonicum – Arizona swallow-wort or Arizona climbing milkweed
 Cynanchum utahense = Funastrum utahense – Utah swallow-wort or Utah vine milkweed

References

External links
Cynanchum at Flora of China

 
Apocynaceae genera